Hascosay (Old Norse "Hafskotsey") is a small island lying between Yell and Fetlar in the Shetland Islands, Scotland.

Geography and geology
The island's rock is coarse micaceous gneiss.

The island has several pools, but the fresh water in them is frequently contaminated by salt spray.

History
The population of the island was 42 in 1841, but had shrunk to thirteen within a decade. In 1871, the population numbered 4, and in 1881, the island was uninhabited. The laird, Arthur Nicholson, who had bought it had "cleared" parts of Fetlar, and it is possible that the islanders removed themselves in anticipation of a possible future forcible eviction by this landowner.

Wildlife

The island is designated as a Special Area of Conservation on account of its largely undisturbed blanket bog habitat.  It is also home to a population of otters.

References

Sites of Special Scientific Interest in Shetland
Uninhabited islands of Shetland
Former populated places in Scotland
Special Areas of Conservation in Scotland